Moycarkey–Borris GAA is a Tipperary GAA club which is located in County Tipperary, Ireland. Both hurling and Gaelic football are played in the "Mid-Tipperary" divisional competitions. The club is centred on the village of Littleton but also takes in areas such as Two-Mile-Borris, Horse and Jockey, and Moycarkey.

Formation
On Sunday, 25 October 1884, a meeting of the Moycarkey branch of the Irish National League was held in their committee rooms in Moycarkey; Rev. D. M. English was in the chair. Very Rev. John Bourke, who was the branch treasurer and a full committee, was present. The following resolution was passed unanimously:
That, in order to join with the majority of our countrymen, in restoring of our own national pastimes, we call on the young men of this parish to form a branch of the Gaelic Athletic Association on Sunday, 1 November at 3 o'clock p.m.
And so, at the same venue, on Sunday, 1 November 1885, exactly one year after the foundation of the G.A.A. in Thurles, a meeting of the young men of the parish was held for the purpose of forming a branch of the G.A.A.
The following gentlemen were unanimously elected: Rev. J. Murphy, C.C., President; Mr. William Fogarty, Vice-President; Mr. John Molumby, Hon. Secretary; Committee: Messrs. Thomas O'Grady, John O'Brien, Patrick Molloy, James O'Grady (Graigue), Michael Shanahan, James Cahill and Daniel Wilson. 
The following resolutions were passed with acclamation:
That we tender our sincere gratitude to our patriotic Archbishop, the Most Rev. Dr. Croke, Charles Stewart Parnell M.P. and Michael Davitt in patronising the ancient and historic pastimes of our people, some of whose only enjoyment was an everlasting round of labour. That we hail with delight the revival of our ancient games. Although we have suffered from emigration and oppression in this parish, yet Moycarkey can boast that they have never given up the ancient game of hurling.
Mr John O'Brien proposed Mr Thomas O'Grady as captain of the club.

History

Years:  1884 – 1899
The first Tipperary Hurling championship began in 1887 and Moycarkey did not have to wait long to claim their first title when a Tom O Grady captained team defeated Toomevara in the 1889 county final, one goal and three points to one goal. From here there was no championship again until 1894, The Parish got back to winning ways almost straight away reaching the county decider in 1897 and again 1898 under the representation of the Horse and Jockey only to find themselves on the wrong side of two close games. The breakthrough finally arrived in 1899 when the horse and jockey under the leadership of Tim Condon won the county final defeating fellow parishioners Two Mile Borris in a replay. This Horse and Jockey team went on to represent Tipperary and win the All Ireland title for the county defeating Blackwater of Wexford in the Final.

Years: 1900 – 1919
The turn of the century saw the emergence of Two Mile Borris as real power house in Tipperary Hurling with Ned Hayes as captain they bounced back from losing the previous year's county final to go on and Win the 1900 county championship and for the second year in row the All Ireland title for the county with a win over Desmonds of London in the Final. 1901 saw the turn of Ballytarsna and their captain Watty Dunne to represent the parish and they went on to win the county final against Lahorna De Wets on a score of 7.11 to 0.01. Ned Hayes and his Two Mile Borris men were back again 1903 and they captured the county title defeating Lahorna De Wets in the final and they repeated this feat again in 1905 defeating lorrah in the county decider. 
In 1907 the Mid Tipperary Championship began with Tom Semple's Thurles men winning the first three titles which meant it was 1910 before Moycarkey Borris claimed their first mid senior title; when Two Mile Borris ended the blues strangle hold on the title. Moycarkey Borris also claimed three mid junior "A" titles in this era with victories for Two Mile Borris in 1909, Horse and Jockey in 1912 and for Moycarkey in 1918.

Years: 1920 - 1939
The 1920s started well for Moycarkey Borris when they claimed the mid title with a victory in 1920 and then went on to complete a three in row of titles from 1922 to 1924. Under the captaincy of John Joe Hayes from Ballyerk Moycarkey Borris were back in the county final in 1926 and after winning the mid title for the fifth time in the decade they went on to defeat Boherlahan 6.04 to 4.02 in a high scoring county final. 
If the 1920s were good times for Moycarkey Borris the 1930s were even better with six mid titles and 4 county titles claimed in the decade. The club dominated mid Tipperary in the early 30s winning five mid senior titles in a row from 1930 to 1934, a feat that would only ever be equalled once by any other club in the history of the mid championship. Moycarkey went on to lose the 1931 county final to Toomevara but it wasn't long before this great team with Phil Purcell as captain started to win county titles and in 1932 they did just that when they defeated Killenaule from South Tipperary 7.06 to 5.01. This victory was then followed up with another county title in 1933 when Moycarkey Borris defeated North Tipperary champions Borrisokane 1.07 to 1.00 in the county decider. The three in a row was completed in the golden jubilee year for the GAA in 1934 with a victory again over the North champions, this time it was Kildangan/Kilbarron who were defeated on a score of 3.06 to 2.03. 
Moycarkey had a new captain Paddy Ryan Sweeper in 1937 and they went on to claim the mid and county honours in this year with a 7.06 to 6.02 victory over West winners Cashel in the county decider. The club also had two titles in the mid junior no.2 championship in this time with victories for Two Mile Borris in 1936 and Graigue in 1939.

Years: 1940 – 1959
In 1940 under captaincy of Tommy Kennedy Moycarkey Borris went on to win the mid title and also the county title with a victory once again over Cashel on a score of 4.07 to 4.02 in the county final. Moycarkey went on to add another mid title in 1943 but lost the county final to Annacarty from west Tipperary on a score of 4.03 to 2.04. This loss would see the end of a great era in the club as many of the players who had now won five county medals and eight mid medals in this time and had served the club for years would retire to make room for fresh talent to come through. Moycarkey Borris struggled to get a strong senior team going from here as many players preferred to play junior for their local area; this resulted in a number of mid junior titles coming to parish but at the cost of senior Hurling so much so that Moycarkey Borris had no senior team in 1954, but won mid and county junior honours and came straight back up senior for the 1955 championship. During this time the parish won five mid junior "A" titles in 1943, 45, 46, 52 and 54 and won Junior no. 2 mid titles with Littleton in 1941, Horse and Jockey in 1942, Two Mile Borris in 1957 and Moycarkey Borris in 1940 & 51.

Years: 1960 – 1979
This period of the club's history started brightly with a first senior county final appearance in nineteen years against Thurles Sarsfields in the 1962 decider, but after a great performance by Moycarkey they lost by one point 1.07 to 1.06. This team bounced back to claim two mid titles in 1965 and 1967 and restore pride to parish and some of the players were still present when a third mid senior title was won in 1971. During this time it was decided that more emphasis would be put into under age hurling so to improve the fortunes of the club. This plan paid dividends straight away with the club winning mid under 21 "A" titles in 1962, 67, 71 and 72 and mid Minor "A" titles in 1968, 69, 72 and 76. County titles at minor level were won in 1968 and 1972 with John Ryan (M) and Michael Clohessy as the winning captains on those teams, the majority of these players would go on help Moycarkey Borris reclaim the Dan Breen in the following years. Junior "A" and junior no.2 titles were also won in this period with the "A" victory coming in 1960 and the no.2 arriving 1978. In 1963 the club made history by winning its very first football title with a win in the mid junior "A" football championship. This victory was followed up with a two in row a mid junior "A" football titles in 1969 and 1970 which meant the club would be playing intermediate football and in 1979 Moycarkey Borris won their first mid intermediate football title.

Years: 1980 – 1999
The 1980s proved to be a very successful period in the club's history with five county titles and 17 mid titles won at adult level between different age groups in both football and hurling. Moycarkey after all their underage work in late 60s and 70s found themselves back in the big time when they won 1981 mid senior hurling final. This victory was built on and in 1982 the club led by Captain Jack Bergin retained the mid title and also ended its 42-year wait for a county senior hurling title with a victory over Roscrea in a replayed county final 2.12 to 0.11. This team also went on to make history and claim the club's first and only Munster club hurling title when they defeated Patrickswell of Limerick by one point on score of 1.09 to 0.11. Moycarkey Borris also won the 1984 county title when they defeated Lorrah form North Tipperary 2.08 to 0.09 to claim the club's 14th county senior hurling title. By winning this county final Moycarkey became the only club in country to win both the jubilee 1934 and centenary 1984 county senior championships.
In 1985 Moycarkey also made history when the club's second team led by John Hackett won mid and county titles at intermediate level defeating Killenaule in the county decider. There were also titles won at mid junior "A level in 1982 and mid junior B" titles in 1982 and 1987. The underage success also continued with the minor team captained by Michael McKenna winning the county title in 1983. A mid under 21 "A" title in 1984 and minor "A" mid titles in 1981, 82, 83 and 86 were also won in the 80s to add to the roll of honour. In 1980 the club's footballers made their biggest ever breakthrough when they won the county intermediate football title with Harry Mulhaire as team captain, this meant that in 1981 Moycarkey would be playing senior football for the first time. The club also won another four mid intermediate football titles in 1980, 85, 86, 88 and junior "A" football titles in 1981 and 86.
After the rush of titles won in the 80s the 90s were quite times for the club with just one mid junior "A" title coming in 1990 and one mid minor "B" title in 1998. In 1999 the club won its first adult county title in 14 years when the under 21 hurlers captained by Micheal Hassett took mid and county honours in the under 21 "B" championship defeating Kildangan in the county final. Moycarkey had similar fortune in football winning the under 21 "B" mid and county in 1997 along with mid minor "B" titles in 1995 and 1997.

Years: 2000 – 2019
In 2002 Moycarkey reached their first mid senior final in 12 years only to lose out by 2 points in a closely fought match, unfortunately the following year Moycarkey were relegated to intermediate level. While playing at this level the club won the mid intermediate final twice in 2005 and 2007 but lost the county final 3 years in a row. In 2008 Moycarkey Borris were back playing senior hurling, and in 2009 were entered in the All Ireland Seven a side championship played in Dublin. The team captained by Pat Carey went on to defeat fellow Tipperary club Kilruane Macdonaghs in the All Ireland final decider to claim the title for the first and only time in the club's history. Moycarkey won their first mid junior "A" hurling title in nineteen years when they won the 2009 mid championship and repeated this feat again in 2012. It was in 2013 that Moycarkey had their greatest achievement since the 1980s when the junior "A" hurlers captained by Phil Kelly claimed both mid and county honours defeating Knockavilla Kickhams in the county final. At minor level the club has been successful winning mid and county minor "A" titles in 2003 with David Sheppard as captain and 2018 with Max Hackett as captain and the 2007 mid and county minor "B" title with James Doran as captain. The club also won the 2005 and 2017 mid minor "A" championship. In December 2017 Chris McCullough and Niall Heffernan captained the under 21 Hurlers against all odds to claim the under 21 B mid and County Honours defeating Lorrah after extra time in a thrilling county final. In Football the biggest success so far this century was the winning of the county intermediate football championship in 2012 for the first time in 32 years. The team captained by Daniel Kirby won both mid and county titles defeating Upperchurch Drombane in both finals. The club added another Mid Intermediate Football title in 2017 and 2019, while also completing a historic four in a row mid titles in Junior "A" football from 2007 to 2010 and also won three junior "B" mid football titles in 2010, 2012 and again in 2013. At underage level the club claimed mid football titles with under 21 "B" in 2002, 2007 and 2016 and minor "B" in 2003.

Years: 2020 – Present

County Final Winning Teams

Senior Hurling
The Moycarkey Team Senior Hurling County Champions 1889:
Team: Tom O Grady (captain), Bill Ryan, John O Brien, James O Brien, Pat Molloy, Dick Maher, Tim Maher, Paddy Flanagan, Paddy Horan, Mick Leahy, Bernard Ryan, Phil Scanlon, Matty Costigan, John Addish, Mike Shanahan, Jim Cahill, Ned Dwyer, Mike Ryan, Patsy Shanahan, Jim Quinnlan, Jack O Grady and Mike Spillane.

The Horse & Jockey Team Senior Hurling County Champions 1899: 
Team: Tim Condon (captain), Mike Wall, Jim, Dick and Joe O'Keeffe, Jimmy Ryan, Bill, Jack and Billie Gleeson, John Flanagan, Watty Dunne, Danny Mullins, Jack Maher, Mickey Condon, Jack Horan, Jack Cahill, John Heffernan. Subs:- Danny Corcoran, Joe Ryan, Con and Dan Gleeson, Stephen O'Sullivan and Ned Grant.

The Two Mile Borris Team Senior Hurling County Champions 1900:
Team: Ned Hayes (captain), Paddy Hayes, Tom Allen, Matty Ryan, Mike Treacy, John and Matt Purcell, Paddy Maher (Best), Tom Healy, Tom Kennedy, Tom Whelan, Denis and Billy Maher, Jack Leahy, John Hackett, James Meaney and James Morris. The subs were Tom Ryan, Charlie Maher and Pat Lonergan.
 
The Ballytarsna Team Senior Hurling County Champions 1901:
Team: Watty Dunne (captain), Tom Dunne, Phil Dunne, Tom Moloney, Dick Maher, Tom Dwyer

The Two Mile Borris Team Senior Hurling County Champions 1903:
Team: Ned Hayes (captain), Paddy Hayes, Tom Allen, John Hackett, Jimmy Bourke, Billy Maher, Charlie Maher, Paddy Maher (Best), Tom Whelan, Matty Ryan, Matt Purcell, Mick Purcell, Mike Wall, Jim Keeffe, Bill Gleeson, Jack Gleeson and Billy Gleeson. The subs were Mike Treacy, Jack Leahy and Phil Leahy.

The Two Mile Borris Team Senior Hurling County Champions 1905:
Team: Ned Hayes (captain), Paddy Hayes, Tom Allen, John Hackett, Jimmy Bourke, Billy Maher, Charlie m 1901:Maher, Paddy Maher (Best), Tom Whelan, Matty Ryan, Matt Purcell, Mick Purcell, Mike Wall, Jim Keeffe, Bill Gleeson, Jack Gleeson and Billy Gleeson. The subs were Mike Treacy, Jack Leahy and Phil Leahy.

The Moycarkey Borris Team Senior Hurling County Champions 1926: 
Team: John Joe Hayes (captain), Mick Ryan (goal), Piery Maher, Joe Maher, Tim Scott, Jack Murphy, Phil Purcell, Lar Molloy, Pake Spillane, Bill Ryan, Tommy Shanahan, Jimmy Heaney, Ned Moloney, Mattie Ryan and Bill O Gorman The subs were Jim Maher, Jimmy Maher, Jack Moloughney, Mick Molloy and Tom Hayes.

The Moycarkey Borris Team Senior Hurling County Champions 1932: 
Team: Phil Purcell (captain) Tommy Kelly (goal), JJ Hayes, Tom Hayes, Jack Grant, Bill Kennedy, Martin Maher, Tom Bourke, Joe Maher, Martin Dwyer, Bill O Brien, John Mullins, Phil Cahill, Tom Dunne and Jimmy Heaney. The subs were Jack Fanning, Paddy Ryan (sweeper), Pat Dunne, Jim Mullins, John Fitzgerald, Jack Gleeson (scooper) and John Maher.

The Moycarkey Borris Team Senior Hurling County Champions 1933: 
Team: Phil Purcell (captain) Tommy Kelly (goal), Phil Cahill, Bill Kennedy, John Mullins, Ed Cahill, Jack Grant, John Maher (dick), Tom Dunne, Patrick Dunne, John Joe Hayes, Tom Hayes, Tom Bourke, Martin Maher and Paddy Ryan (sweeper). The subs were Jimmy Heaney, Martin Dwyer and John Fanning.

The Moycarkey Borris Team Senior Hurling County Champions 1934: 
Team: Phil Purcell (captain) Tommy Kelly (goal), WM Kennedy, Tom Kennedy, Denis Healy, John Joe Hayes, Tom Hayes, Martin Maher, Jack Grant, Paddy Ryan (sweeper) Johnny Ryan, Tom Dunne, Pat Dunne, Joe Maher and Bill O Brien. The subs were John Maher, Pat Ryan, Ned Cahill and John Fanning.

The Moycarkey Borris Team Senior Hurling County Champions 1937: 
Team: Paddy Ryan (sweeper) (captain) Tommy Kelly (goal), Tommy Hayes, Johnny Ryan, Martin Healy, Thomas O Keeffe, Mattie Ryan, Paddy Maher, Michael Dempsey, Tom Kennedy, Tom Hayes, James Maher, Mutt Ryan, Willie O Keeffe and Willie Ryan. The subs were Martin Maher, Pat Hassett, Phil Purcell and Pat Connell.

The Moycarkey Borris Team Senior Hurling County Champions 1940: 
Team: Tom Kennedy (captain) Tommy Kelly (goal), James Maher, Tommy Hayes, Dick Grant, Michael Dempsey, Johnny Ryan, Paddy Maher, Martin Healy, Paddy Ryan (sweeper), Willie Ryan, Mutt Ryan, Tom Hayes, Dick Buckley and Jim Duggan. The subs were Tommy Tobin and Thomas O Keeffe.

The Moycarkey Borris Team Senior Hurling County Champions 1982
Team: Tom Doran, Robert Hayes, Willie Ryan, Tom Mullins, Eamon Darmody, Jack Bergin (Capt), Jimmy Leahy, Liam Bergin, Jim Flanagan, Tommy Quigley, John McCormack, David Fogarty, Jack Caeser, Dickie Quigley and John Flanagan. Subs: Robert Hayes, for Jimmy Leahy, Jim Flanagan for John Hackett.

The Moycarkey Borris Team Senior Hurling County Champions 1984
Team: Tom Doran, John Hackett, Willie Ryan, Tom Mullins, Eamon Darmody, Jack Bergin (Capt), Jimmy Leahy, Liam Bergin, Liam Dempsey, Timmy Cullagh, John McCormack, David Fogarty, Ned Slattery, Dickie Quigley and John Flanagan. Subs: John Hackett, Eddie Clancy and Bill Gooney.

Senior 'B' Hurling
The Moycarkey Borris Team Senior 'B' Hurling County Champions 2011
Team: John Kelly, James Power, Paul Dempsey, David Morris, Rory Ryan, Pat Molloy, Willie Dempsey (Captain), Pat Carey, Brian Moran, Robert Doran, Phil kelly, Pat Ralph, Ciaran Clohessy, Kieran Morris and Anthony healy. Subs: John Bergin, Ailbe Power, James Bourke, Kevin Moran and Lorcan Ryan.

The Moycarkey Borris Team Senior 'B' Hurling County Champions 2012
Team: John Kelly, James Power, David Morris, Kevin Moran (Captain), Paul Dempsey, Pat Molloy, Ailbe Power, Pat Carey, Brian Moran, Rory Ryan, David Sheppard, Mossy Bracken, Ciaran Clohessy, Phil Kelly and Kieran Morris. Subs: Robert Doran, John Bergin, Ger Carey, Eamon Clohessy and Joe Sullivan.

All Ireland Sevens Hurling
The Moycarkey Borris Team All Ireland Sevens Hurling Champions 2009
Team: John Kelly, Paul Dempsey, David Morris, Pat Carey (Captain), Kevin Moran, Robert Doran, Kieran Morris, Ger Carey, Brian Moran and Joe Dixon.
Manager: Liam Hackett.
Selectors: Pat Maher, Joe Moran and Aidan O Leary.

Intermediate Hurling
The Moycarkey Borris Team Intermediate Hurling County Champions 1985
Team: Martin Cooney, John Hackett (Captain), Patrick Maher, Michael McKenna, Phil Cahill, Jimmy Bergin, Michael Dempsey, Liam Hackett, Jim Flanagan, Declan Kirwan, Liam Bergin, Eamon Waslh, Eamon Healy, John Commins and Michael Fanning. Subs: Pat Flanagan, Toddy Walsh, Johnny Cleary, Eamon Darmody, Michael Clohessy, Dan Bergin, Thomas Cussen, Thomas Shanahan and Tom Kirwan.

Junior Hurling
The Moycarkey Borris Team Junior Hurling County Champions 1954
Team: Billy Shanahan (goals), Larry Hayes, Billy Molumby, Jim Molumby, Donal Ryan, Billy Ryan, John Donnelly, Larry Dowling, Seamus Mooney, Jim Fanning, Sean Corcoran, Ken Darmody, John Hassett, Ned Hassett and Billy Dowling. Sub: Tony Molloy.

The Moycarkey Borris Team Junior Hurling County Champions 2013
Team: John Kelly; Jeff Fallon, Gary O’Connell, Joseph O’Sullivan; Gerry McGuire, Eamon Flanagan, Mossy Bracken; Ger Carey, Brian Moran; Pat Ralph, John Bergin, Robert Doran; Donie Bergin, Phil Kelly (Captain), Niall Heffernan. Subs: Aidan Maher, Matty Ryan, Kieran Shortall.
Manager: John O' Keffee. 
Selectors: Johnny Flanagan, Tom Gleeson, Henry Bourke and Johnny Ryan (S).

Under 21 Hurling
The Moycarkey Borris Team Under 21 "A" Hurling County Champions 2021
Team: Rhys Shelly, Bill Maher, Peter Melbourne, Kyle Ryan, Cathal Corcoran, Tom Ryan, Rory Darmody, Jack Fallon, Stephen Walsh, Joe Maher, Max Hackett, Brendan Looby, Jack Morrissey, Kyle Shelly and Darren Flood. Subs: Ciaran Kirwan, Diarmuid Maher, James Dillon, Liam Mcdonnagh, Andrew Alexander, Kevin O Halloran, Thomas Whelan, Liam O Meara, Joey Ryan, Bill Hackett, Kevin Hayes, Liam Hayes and Aidan Scott.
Manager: John Kelly.  
Selectors: Willie Ryan (T), Anthony Healy, Gerry Maguire, Robert Clancy and Shane Nolan.

The Moycarkey Borris Team Under 21 "B" Hurling County Champions 1999
Team: John Kelly, Donnacha Hennessy, Tom Kelly, Eoin Butler, Colm Ryan, Eamon Ryan, Paul Dempsey, Paudie Doran, Connor Bannon, Kevin O Regan, Pat Carey, Ken Ryan, Robert Doran, Michael Hassett and Willie Dempsey. Subs: Michael Healy, Nicky Hogan, PJ Flanagan, Francis Ryall, Rick Quigley, John Butler, Matthew Shortall, Colm Ryan and Conor Butler.
Manager: Christy Clancy.  
Selectors: Billy Lanigan, Tom Gleeson, Dickie Quigley and Larry Ryan (M).

The Moycarkey Borris Team Under 21 "B" Hurling County Champions 2017
Team: Rhys Shelly, Mikey Bergin, Eric Fanning, Kieran Kearney, Eoghan Hayes, Chris McCullagh, Rory Darmody, Niall Heffernan, Kieran Cummins, Joe Doran, Tom Hayes, Kevin O’Regan, JJ Darmody, Anthony McKelvey, Jack Fallon. Subs: Pat Whelan, David O’Donnell, Brian Maher, Bill Maher, James Whelan, Mossy Darmody, Jessie Mckeanna and Jack Cleary. 
Manager: John Kelly.  
Selectors: Billy Lanigan, Colm Ryan (G) and Paddy Shanahan.

Minor Hurling
The Moycarkey Borris Team Minor "A" Hurling County Champions 1968
Team: J. Caeser, Dan Hayes, John Ryan (M) (captain), J. Flanagan, S. Darmody, W. Ryan, Johnnie Flanagan, T. Buckley, Matt Bourke, J. Costello, W. Flanagan, Billy Ryan (Larry), Billy Gooney, Pat Guilfoyle and Mick Ryan. Subs: Martin Ryan, P. Skehan and T. Purtill.

The Moycarkey Borris Team Minor "A" Hurling County Champions 1972
Team: Tom Doran, Michael Purcell, Eamon Power, Jack Bergin, Connor Kennedy, Philip Croke, Dan Mullins, Eamon Darmody, Martin Hewitt, Eddie Moore, Michael Clohessy (captain), Dick Quigley, Tom Forrestal, Martin Heffernan and John Sweeney. Sub: Pat Leahy.

The Moycarkey Borris Team Minor "A" Hurling County Champions 1983
Team: Martin Cooney, Mark McKenna, Michael McKenna (captain), Seamus Morris, Jimmy Bergin, Joe Bracken, Frankie Gleeson, Phil Cahill, Tommy Noonan, Milo Cleary, Johnny Cleary, Declan Kirwan, John Commins, Mark Shaw and Declan Byrne, Sub: Timmy Darmody, Martin Doherty, Michael Quinn

The Moycarkey Borris Team Minor "A" Hurling County Champions 2003
Team: Shane Barry, Peter O Brien, Kieran Shortall, Tom Quinn, Diarmuid Healy, Kevin Moran, Eddie Power, Ger Carey, Joe Dixon, Phil Kelly, Brian Moran, David Sheppard (captain), Dan Kirby, Brian Hogan and Ciaran Clohessy. Subs: Rory Coote and Anthony Healy.
Manager: Jack Bergin.
Selectors: Jim Flanagan and Nicky Hogan.

The Moycarkey Borris Team Minor "A" Hurling County Champions 2018
Team: Ciaran Kirwin, Kyle Ryan, John Kirwan, Peter Melbourne, Tom Ryan, Kevin Hayes, Rory Darmody, Max Hackett, Jack Morrissey, Kyle Shelly, Bill Maher, Rhys Shelly, James Dillon, Darren Flood, Jack Fallon.
Manager: Jack Bergin.
Selectors: Ned Darmody, Tom Ryan, Eamon Clohessy and Ray Ralph.

The Moycarkey Borris Team Minor "B" Hurling County Champions 2007
Team: James Doran (captain), Tomas O'Gorman, John Shortall, JosephO'Sullivan, Eamon Flanagan, Rory Ryan, Mossy Bracken, Michael O'Connell, Cathal Bergin, Kieran Morris, Jamie Barry, Pat Molloy, Gary O'Connell, Eoin O'Dwyer and Eolan McCarthy. Subs: Philip Grace and Shane Hackett.
Manager: PJ Flanagan.
Selectors: Jim Fanning, Donal Donnelly, Martin Cooney, Aidan O'Leary

Intermediate Football
The Moycarkey Borris Team Intermediate Football County Champions 1980
Team: Michael Clohessy, Liam Dempsey, Michael Power, Jim Flanagan, Matty Ryan, Matty Bourke, Eamon Darmody, Sean Sherlock, Martin Ryan, Billy Ryan, Harry Mulhaire (Capt), Tommy Quigley, Eddie Clancy, Pat Flanagan and Dickie Quigley. Subs: John Flanagan, Sean Ryan, John McGinley, Dan Hayes and Eamon Walsh.

The Moycarkey Borris Team Intermediate Football County Champions 2012
Team: Daniel Kirby (Captain), Niall O’Sullivan, Paul Dempsey, Brian Moran; John Kelly, David Morris, Michael Cussen; Pat Carey, Rory Ryan; Conor Hayes, Paudie Doran, Pat Molloy; Anthony Healy, Ciaran Clohessy and Kieran Morris Subs: Mossy Bracken, Michael Roche, Eamon Flanagan, Phil Kelly, Eamon Clohessy, Robert Doran, Jeff Fallon, James Bourke, Joe Sullivan, John Bergin, Jamie Fanning and Kevin Moran.
Manager: Micheal Clohessy.
Selectors: Tim Kelly, Eddie Ryan and Pat Flanagan.

Under 21 Football
The Moycarkey Borris Team Under 21 "B" Football County Champions 1997
Team: Tom Kelly, Noel Butler (captain), Robert Clancy, Nicky Hogan, Tomas Coman, Anthony Kirby, Michael Shortall, Pat Coman, TJ Ryan, Ken Ryan, Robert Doran, James Cashin, Kevin O Regan, David Minchin and Conal O Reilly. Subs: Brian Lamphier, Noel Maher, Willie Cashin, Donal Donnelly, Austin Cooney, Paddy Shanahan, Michael O Regan, Michael Hassett, Kevin Shortall, Danny Meaney, David Bannon and Matthew Shortall.

Roll of Honour

Hurling
All-Ireland Senior Hurling 7's: 1
2009 (Pat Carey)
Munster Senior Club Hurling Championship: 1
1982 (Jack Bergin)
Tipperary Senior Hurling Championship: 14
1889 (Tom O'Grady), 1899 (Tim Condon) (as Horse & Jockey), 1900 (Ned Hayes) (as Two-Mile Borris), 1901 (Watty Dunne), 1903 (Ned Hayes), 1905 (Ned Hayes), 1926 (John Joe Hayes), 1932 (Phil Purcell), 1933 (Phil Purcell), 1934 (Phil Purcell), 1937 (Paddy Ryan "Sweeper"), 1940 (Tom Kennedy), 1982 (Jack Bergin), 1984 (Jack Bergin).
Tipperary Senior 'B' Hurling Championship: 2
2011 (Willie Dempsey), 2012 (Kevin Moran)
Tipperary Intermediate Hurling Championship: 1
1985 (John Hackett)
Tipperary Junior A Hurling Championship: 2
1954 (Michael Shanahan), 2013 (Phil Kelly)
Tipperary Under-21 A Hurling Championship: 1
2021 (Rhys Shelly)
Tipperary Under-21 B Hurling Championship: 2
1999 (Micheal Hassett), 2017 (Chris McCullough & Niall Heffernan)
Tipperary Minor A Hurling Championship: 5
1968 (John Ryan (M)), 1972 (Michael Clohessy), 1983 (Michael McKenna), 2003 (David Sheppard), 2018 (Max Hackett)
Tipperary Minor B Hurling Championship: 1
2007 (James Doran)
Mid Tipperary Senior Hurling Championship: 19
1910 (Ned Hayes) (as Two-Mile-Borris), 1920 (as Moycarkey-Thurles), 1922, 1923, 1924, 1926 (John Joe Hayes), 1930, 1931, 1932 (Phil Purcell), 1933 (Phil Purcell), 1934 (Phil Purcell), 1937 (Paddy Ryan "Sweeper"), 1940 (Tom Kennedy), 1943 (Johnny Ryan), 1965, 1967, 1971 (Mick Lonergan), 1981 (Jack Bergin), 1982 (Jack Bergin)
Mid Tipperary Intermediate Hurling Championship: 3
1985 (John Hackett), 2005 (Pat Carey), 2007 (Robert Doran)
Mid Tipperary Junior A Hurling Championship: 14
1909 (Jim Skehan) (as Horse & Jockey/Two-Mile-Borris), 1912 (as Horse & Jockey), 1918 (as Moycarkey ), 1943, 1945, 1946, 1952, 1954, 1960, 1982, 1990 (Martin Cooney), 2009 (Ger Dempsey), 2012 (Gerry 'Magoo' Maguire), 2013 (Phil Kelly)
Mid Tipperary No.2 Junior Hurling Championship: 9
1936 (as Two-Mile-Borris),1939 (as Graigue), 1940, 1941 (as Littleton), 1942 (as Horse & Jockey), 1951 (as Moycarkey), 1957 (John Ryan),1978, 1982
Mid Tipperary Junior B Hurling Championship: 1
1987
Mid Tipperary Under 21 A Hurling Championship: 6
1962, 1967, 1971, 1972, 1984 (John O Keffee), 2021 (Rhys Shelly)
Mid Tipperary Under 21 B Hurling Championship: 2
1999 (Micheal Hassett), 2017 (Chris McCullough & Niall Heffernan)
Mid Tipperary Minor A Hurling Championship: 11
1968, 1969, 1972 (Michael Clohessy), 1975, 1981, 1983 (Michael McKenna), 1986 (Andrew Bourke), 2003 (David Sheppard), 2005 (Brian Moran), 2017 (Anthony McKelvey), 2018 (Max Hackett)
Mid Tipperary Minor B Hurling Championship: 2
1998, 2007 (James Doran)

Football
Tipperary Intermediate Football Championship: 3
1980 (Harry Mulhaire), 2012 (Daniel Kirby), 2019 (Rory Ryan)
Tipperary Under-21 B Football Championship: 1
1997 (Noel Butler)
Mid Tipperary Intermediate Football Championship: 8
1979, 1980 (Harry Mulhaire), 1985, 1986, 1988, 2012 (Daniel Kirby), 2017 (Pat Carey), 2019 (Rory Ryan)
Mid Tipperary Junior A Football Championship: 9
1963, 1969, 1970, 1981, 1986, 2007 (Paul Dempsey), 2008 (Anthony Healy), 2009 (Robert Doran), 2010 (Tony Flanagan)
Mid Tipperary Junior B Football Championship: 3
2010 (Eoin Cantwell), 2012 (Jamie Fanning), 2013 (John Kelly)
Mid Tipperary Under 21 B Football Championship: 4
1997 (Noel Butler), 2002 (Eamon Ryan), 2007 (Phil Kelly), 2016 (Aidan Maher)
Mid Tipperary Minor B Football Championship: 3
1995, 1997, 2003 (Diarmuid Healy)

Notable players
 Tom Allen
 Jack Bergin
 Ned Bowe
 John Flanagan
 John Joe Hayes
 Edmond Ned Hayes
 Ned Hayes
 Mick Lonergan
 Bob Mockler
 John Mockler
 Martin Mockler
 Kieran Morris
 John O'Grady
 Phil Purcell
 Tommy Purcell
 Danny Ryan
 Johnny Ryan
 Paddy Ryan
 Pat Ryan

References

External links
Moycarkey–Borris GAA site
Tipperary GAA site

Gaelic games clubs in County Tipperary
Hurling clubs in County Tipperary